Atomic nuclei consist of protons and neutrons, which attract each other through the nuclear force, while protons repel each other via the electric force due to their positive charge. These two forces compete, leading to some combinations of neutrons and protons being more stable than others. Neutrons stabilize the nucleus, because they attract protons, which helps offset the electrical repulsion between protons. As a result, as the number of protons increases, an increasing ratio of neutrons to protons is needed to form a stable nucleus; if too many or too few neutrons are present with regard to the optimum ratio, the nucleus becomes unstable and subject to certain types of nuclear decay. Unstable isotopes decay through various radioactive decay pathways, most commonly alpha decay, beta decay, or electron capture. Many rare types of decay, such as spontaneous fission or cluster decay, are known. (See Radioactive decay for details.)

Of the first 82 elements in the periodic table, 80 have isotopes considered to be stable. Technetium and promethium (atomic numbers 43 and 61, respectively) and all the elements with an atomic number over 82 only have isotopes that are known to decompose through radioactive decay. No undiscovered elements are expected to be stable; therefore, lead is considered the heaviest stable element. However, it is possible that some isotopes that are now considered stable will be revealed to decay with extremely long half-lives (as with ). This list depicts what is agreed upon by the consensus of the scientific community as of 2022.

For each of the 80 stable elements, the number of the stable isotopes is given. Only 90 isotopes are expected to be perfectly stable, and an additional 161 are energetically unstable, but have never been observed to decay. Thus, 251 isotopes (nuclides) are stable by definition (including tantalum-180m, for which no decay has yet been observed). Those that may in the future be found to be radioactive are expected to have half-lives longer than 1022 years (for example, xenon-134).

In April 2019 it was announced that the half-life of xenon-124 had been measured to 1.8 × 1022 years. This is the longest half-life directly measured for any unstable isotope; only the half-life of tellurium-128 is longer.

Of the chemical elements, only 1 element (tin) has 10 such stable isotopes, 5 have 7 stable isotopes, 7 have 6 stable isotopes, 11 have 5 stable isotopes, 9 have 4 stable isotopes, 5 have 3 stable isotopes, 16 have 2 stable isotopes, and 26 have 1 stable isotope.

Additionally, about 31 nuclides of the naturally occurring elements have unstable isotopes with a half-life larger than the age of the Solar System (~109 years or more). An additional four nuclides have half-lives longer than 100 million years, which is far less than the age of the solar system, but long enough for some of them to have survived. These 35 radioactive naturally occurring nuclides comprise the radioactive primordial nuclides. The total number of primordial nuclides is then 251 (the stable nuclides) plus the 35 radioactive primordial nuclides, for a total of 286 primordial nuclides. This number is subject to change if new shorter-lived primordials are identified on Earth.

One of the primordial nuclides is tantalum-180m, which is predicted to have a half-life in excess of 1015 years, but has never been observed to decay. The even-longer half-life of 2.2 × 1024 years of tellurium-128 was measured by a unique method of detecting its radiogenic daughter xenon-128 and is the longest known experimentally measured half-life. Another notable example is the only naturally occurring isotope of bismuth, bismuth-209, which has been predicted to be unstable with a very long half-life, but has been observed to decay. Because of their long half-lives, such isotopes are still found on Earth in various quantities, and together with the stable isotopes they are called primordial isotope. All the primordial isotopes are given in order of their decreasing abundance on Earth. For a list of primordial nuclides in order of half-life, see List of nuclides.

118 chemical elements are known to exist. All elements to element 94 are found in nature, and the remainder of the discovered elements are artificially produced, with isotopes all known to be highly radioactive with relatively short half-lives (see below). The elements in this list are ordered according to the lifetime of their most stable isotope. Of these, three elements (bismuth, thorium, and uranium) are primordial because they have half-lives long enough to still be found on the Earth, while all the others are produced either by radioactive decay or are synthesized in laboratories and nuclear reactors. Only 13 of the 38 known-but-unstable elements have isotopes with a half-life of at least 100 years. Every known isotope of the remaining 25 elements is highly radioactive; these are used in academic research and sometimes in industry and medicine. Some of the heavier elements in the periodic table may be revealed to have yet-undiscovered isotopes with longer lifetimes than those listed here.

About 338 nuclides are found naturally on Earth. These comprise 251 stable isotopes, and with the addition of the 35 long-lived radioisotopes with half-lives longer than 100 million years, a total of 286 primordial nuclides, as noted above. The nuclides found naturally comprise not only the 286 primordials, but also include about 52 more short-lived isotopes (defined by a half-life less than 100 million years, too short to have survived from the formation of the Earth) that are daughters of primordial isotopes (such as radium from uranium); or else are made by energetic natural processes, such as carbon-14 made from atmospheric nitrogen by bombardment from cosmic rays.

Elements by number of primordial isotopes
An even number of protons or neutrons is more stable (higher binding energy) because of pairing effects, so even–even nuclides are much more stable than odd–odd. One effect is that there are few stable odd–odd nuclides: in fact only five are stable, with another four having half-lives longer than a billion years.

Another effect is to prevent beta decay of many even–even nuclides into another even–even nuclide of the same mass number but lower energy, because decay proceeding one step at a time would have to pass through an odd–odd nuclide of higher energy. (Double beta decay directly from even–even to even–even, skipping over an odd-odd nuclide, is only occasionally possible, and is a process so strongly hindered that it has a half-life greater than a billion times the age of the universe.) This makes for a larger number of stable even–even nuclides, up to three for some mass numbers, and up to seven for some atomic (proton) numbers and at least four for all stable even-Z elements beyond iron (except strontium and lead).

Since a nucleus with an odd number of protons is relatively less stable, odd-numbered elements tend to have fewer stable isotopes. Of the 26 "monoisotopic" elements that have only a single stable isotope, all but one have an odd atomic number—the single exception being beryllium. In addition, no odd-numbered element has more than two stable isotopes, while every even-numbered element with stable isotopes, except for helium, beryllium, and carbon, has at least three. Only a single odd-numbered element, potassium, has three primordial isotopes; none have more than three.

Tables
The following tables give the elements with primordial nuclides, which means that the element may still be identified on Earth from natural sources, having been present since the Earth was formed out of the solar nebula. Thus, none are shorter-lived daughters of longer-lived parental primordials, such as radon. Two nuclides which have half-lives long enough to be primordial, but have not yet been conclusively observed as such (244Pu and 146Sm), have been excluded.

The tables of elements are sorted in order of decreasing number of nuclides associated with each element. (For a list sorted entirely in terms of half-lives of nuclides, with mixing of elements, see List of nuclides.) Stable and unstable (marked decays) nuclides are given, with symbols for unstable (radioactive) nuclides in italics. Note that the sorting does not quite give the elements purely in order of stable nuclides, since some elements have a larger number of long-lived unstable nuclides, which place them ahead of elements with a larger number of stable nuclides. By convention, nuclides are counted as "stable" if they have never been observed to decay by experiment or from observation of decay products (extremely long-lived nuclides unstable only in theory, such as tantalum-180m, are counted as stable).

The first table is for even-atomic numbered elements, which tend to have far more primordial nuclides, due to the stability conferred by proton-proton pairing. A second separate table is given for odd-atomic numbered elements, which tend to have far fewer stable and long-lived (primordial) unstable nuclides.

Elements with no primordial isotopes

See also
Island of stability

List of nuclides
List of radioactive nuclides by half-life
Primordial nuclide
Stable nuclide
Stable isotope ratio
Table of nuclides

Footnotes

References

 Stability of isotopes